Scars Remain is the sixth album by Christian alternative metal group Disciple, released November 7, 2006.

Track listing

Reception

The Album peaked at No. 118 on the Billboard top 200, No. 9 on Christian Albums and No. 1 on Heatseaker albums when it was released.

Awards
In 2008, the album won a Dove Award for Rock Album of the Year at the 39th GMA Dove Awards. The song "After the World" was also nominated for Rock/Contemporary Recorded Song of the Year.

Trivia
 "Game On" was the theme song for WWE Cyber Sunday 2006.
 On the iTunes Music Store there is a remix of "Game On" for all NFL Football Teams.

References

External links
Disciple official webpage
[ Allmusic album main page]

2006 albums
Disciple (band) albums
INO Records albums
Albums produced by Travis Wyrick